Golf Saskatchewan (previously known as the Saskatchewan Golf Association) is the provincial amateur governing body for the sport of golf in the province of Saskatchewan.  The organization is a member of Golf Canada, the national sport governing body. Golf Saskatchewan is overseen by an elected board of directors from across Saskatchewan.

History 
The Saskatchewan Golf Association came to its current structure on April 12, 1999 when it was officially incorporated for business through the amalgamation of the previous Saskatchewan Golf Association (SGA), an all-male organization, and the Canadian Ladies Golf Association (CLGA) Saskatchewan Branch, an all-female organization.  The SGA was formed in 1913.   Meanwhile, the CLGA Saskatchewan Branch was officially formed in 1926.

Tournaments 
Each year, Golf Saskatchewan holds nine provincial championship events at predetermined locations across the province.  The tournaments conducted on an annual basis are:
 Saskatchewan Junior Men's Championship
 Saskatchewan Junior Women's Championship
 Saskatchewan Amateur Women's Championship
 Saskatchewan Mid-Amateur Men's Championship
 Saskatchewan Amateur Men's Championship
 Saskatchewan Senior Men's Championship
Saskatchewan Mid-Master's (40+) Championship
 Saskatchewan Senior Women's Championship
Saskatchewan Women's Rosebowl Championship
Saskatchewan Mixed Team Championship

Past Presidents

References

Sports governing bodies in Saskatchewan
Golf in Canada